The joyful greenbul (Chlorocichla laetissima) or joyful bulbul, is a species of songbird in the bulbul family, Pycnonotidae. It is found in east-central Africa. Its natural habitats are boreal forests and subtropical or tropical moist montane forests.

Taxonomy and systematics
The joyful greenbul was originally described in the genus Andropadus and later re-classified within Chlorocichla.

Subspecies
Two subspecies of the joyful greenbul are recognized:
  C. l. laetissima - (Sharpe, 1899): Found from southern Sudan to south-western Kenya and north-eastern Democratic Republic of the Congo
  C. l. schoutedeni - Prigogine, 1954: Found in eastern Democratic Republic of the Congo and northern Zambia

References

External links
Image at ADW

joyful greenbul
Birds of Central Africa
Birds of East Africa
joyful greenbul
Taxonomy articles created by Polbot